Johan Rudolph Thorbecke (14 January 1798 – 4 June 1872) was a Dutch liberal statesman, one of the most important Dutch politicians of the 19th century. Thorbecke is best known for heading the commission that drafted the revision of the Constitution of the Netherlands in 1848, amidst the liberal democratic revolutions of 1848. The new constitution transformed the country from an absolute monarchy into a constitutional monarchy, with the States General and the Council of Ministers becoming more powerful than the king. The amended constitution also granted individual rights to residents and citizens of the kingdom. This made the constitution one of the more progressive at the time. Thorbecke is generally considered a founding father of the modern political system of Netherlands.

Early life and education

Thorbecke was born in Zwolle. His father Frederik Willem was a Lutheran tobacco manufacturer of German descent, while his mother Christine Regina was born in the Lower Saxon Osnabrück. Frederik Willem's business suffered badly from the anti-British policies of the French occupiers, and his tobacco factory went bankrupt in 1803, after which he was unable to find another source of employment and would spend most of his time on the education of Johan Rudolph and his younger brother. Johan Rudolph proved to be diligent and exemplary at a young age, showing intelligence and curiosity. Because of the sacrifices of his parents, who continued to struggle with financial problems, he was able to enjoy decent education. He enjoyed primary education in his birthplace and in Amsterdam, where he lived until 1806, and attended a Latin school back in Zwolle until 1814. Thorbecke began studying classical literature and philosophy in Amsterdam, studies he finished in Leiden defending a thesis on Asinius Pollio in 1820.

Shortly after taking his doctorate, Thorbecke was granted a state scholarship for a journey through Germany. At Giessen he lectured as an extraordinary professor, and at Göttingen, in 1824, published his treatise, Ueber das Wesen der Geschichte. He would spend four years travelling, during which he was introduced to historism and Romanticism, and developed emotionally and spiritually. Upon his return to the Netherlands in 1824, he settled in Amsterdam, where he wrote his first political work of significance, Bedenkingen aangaande het Regt en Den Staat ("Concerns about the Law and the State"). The work managed to catch attention, and Thorbecke became professor of Political Science at Ghent University the following year, a position he was forced to resign from due to the Belgian Revolution in 1830. The following year, Thorbecke became professor of Diplomacy and Modern History at the Leiden University, where his students would describe him as a distant, analytical mind, living a secluded life in his study.

Originally a loyal supporter of the conservative government of William I, Thorbecke developed a more critical view of the government and indeed the autocratic system of government throughout the 1830s. His increasingly strong support for constitutional reform is shown in a series of essays he published from 1839 onward, starting with Aanteekening op de grondwet, literally "Annotation on the constitution". The climax of this series was Over het hedendaags staatsburgerschap, literally "On contemporary citizenship", published in 1844, in which he argued that universal suffrage would eventually be unavoidable.

Political career

On 21 May 1844, Thorbecke was elected to the House of Representatives for South Holland. In the House, he developed into the leader of the liberal opposition and, later that year, joined forces with eight like-minded members in a vain attempt to amend the constitution in the so-called Voorstel der Negenmannen ("Proposition of the Nine Men"). Four years later, with much of Europe convulsed by the Revolutions of 1848, William II agreed to the formation of a committee for revision of the constitution. Thorbecke was appointed as head of this committee on 17 March. The changes were in large part created by Thorbecke and based on his earlier constitutional writings. The draft constitution was somewhat reluctantly approved by the States General, and was proclaimed on 3 November 1848. The new constitution established civil rights and parliamentary competences, and introduced direct election of members of the House of Representatives and ministerial responsibility, thus limiting the power of the King and turning the country into a complete constitutional monarchy.

Despite initial reluctance, William III appointed Thorbecke as formateur in late October 1849, and his first cabinet took office on 13 November. In this cabinet, Thorbecke served as minister of the Interior and chaired the Council of Ministers, thus becoming de facto Prime Minister of the Netherlands. Thorbecke's first cabinet passed several acts of particular importance, including the Electoral Act and the Province Act in 1850, and the Municipality Act in the following year. Despite these successes, Thorbecke's reforms faced increasing resistance, and he was criticised for his haughtiness and his strained relationship with the King. In 1853, the Catholic Church sought to restore the episcopal hierarchy in the Netherlands. Common people, pastors and conservative notables showed resistance to this in an anti-papal movement known as the Aprilbeweging ("April Movement"). Thorbecke, who remained passive in the issue in defence of the separation of church and state, was accused of catholic sympathies, and he was forced to resign.

Thorbecke spent nine years as leader of the opposition in the House of Representatives. He pleaded for neutrality in the Crimean War 1854, and opposed the religious nature of the Primary Education Act in 1857.

The collapse of the conservative cabinet in 1862 brought Thorbecke back in power. On 31 January 1862, he started his second term as minister of the Interior and chairman of the Council of Ministers. Thorbecke's relationship with the King had improved because the focus of his reforms had shifted from politics to economics, and despite the increased disunity among the liberals, his cabinet lasted for four years because of the support of the Catholics. One of Thorbecke's first acts in his second term was the abolition of the governmental departments for religious affairs. 
Other notable achievements include the construction of several canals, several acts on healthcare, the municipal tax reform in 1865 and the Secondary Education Act in May 1863.

The latter would later prove to be one of his governmental masterpieces; in addition to the gymnasium, the new schooltype Hogere Burgerschool (HBS) would provide education to some hundreds of thousands of students between 1864 and 1974. As a result of a reform in 1968 the HBS was succeeded by the school types like HAVO and atheneum.

The cabinet collapsed on 10 February 1866 and Thorbecke resigned after a conflict regarding criminal law in the Dutch East Indies.

Thorbecke returned to being leader of the opposition in the House of Representatives. In 1868, he formed the Van Bosse-Fock cabinet, but did not take part in the cabinet himself. Three years later, after this cabinet had collapsed over foreign policy, the 73-year-old Thorbecke did not hesitate to start his third term. In December 1871 however, he fell ill and never fully recovered. Thorbecke died at his home in The Hague on 4 June 1872, at the age of 74.

Hated by some (he was not a man of concessions), he is nowadays considered a towering figure in Dutch parliamentary history. There are three statues of Thorbecke (one in Amsterdam, one in The Hague and one in Zwolle) and a room in the Dutch parliament building is named after him.

Thorbecke wrote many articles on history and several newspaper articles (especially in the Journal de La Haye) on topics of the day. He published a study on the philosophy of history (in German). All of his speeches in parliament have been published.

References

Further reading 
: Thorbecke: een filosoof in de politiek. Amsterdam, 2004.
: Thorbecke en de wording van de Nederlandse natie. Nijmegen, 1980.
: Rondom 1848. Bussum 1978.
: Thorbecke en de historie. 1938. Second edition with a preface by H. te Velde: Utrecht, 1986.
: Thorbecke-Archief (3 volumes). Contains Thorbecke's letters  up until September 1830. Utrecht, 1955, Groningen, 1962, Utrecht, 1967.
: De Briefwisseling van J.R. Thorbecke (7 delen). Contains Thorbecke's letters as of October 1830 until his death. These volumes appeared between 1975 en 2002.

External links

 
 Thorbecke PhD Thesis on Asinius Pollio on Google Books
 Thorbecke PhD Thesis on Asinius Pollio on Archive dot Org

|-

|-

|-

|-

|-

1798 births
1872 deaths
Dutch civil servants
Dutch jurists
Dutch legal scholars
Dutch legal writers
Dutch political writers
Dutch education writers
Dutch educators
19th-century Dutch historians
Dutch historians of philosophy
Dutch people of German descent
International relations scholars
Philosophy academics
Philosophy writers
Deaths from pneumonia in the Netherlands
Evangelical Lutheran Church Christians from the Netherlands
Leiden University alumni
Academic staff of Leiden University
Members of the House of Representatives (Netherlands)
Ministers of the Interior of the Netherlands
Ministers of State (Netherlands)
People from Zwolle
Prime Ministers of the Netherlands
19th-century Lutherans